Goldstone is a 2016 Australian crime thriller film directed by Ivan Sen. It is a sequel to Mystery Road (2013) and stars Aaron Pedersen, Alex Russell, Jacki Weaver, David Wenham and David Gulpilil. It was released in Australia on 7 July 2016. According to the film's end credits, it was largely shot on location in the small town of Middleton, Queensland, Australia.

Plot 
Three years after exposing the corruption in his hometown of Winton, Queensland, the Indigenous detective Jay Swan is sent to the small mining town of Goldstone to find a missing Asian tourist. He is pulled over for driving under the influence by a young local cop, Josh, who informs the town's corrupt mayor, Maureen.

Jay is asleep in a motel caravan when it's shot up by two men, one with an eye patch. When Josh arrives, Jay tells him of his case.

Josh tells him the motel management is furious and wants Jay to leave. Josh takes him to a remote off-grid shelter.

Josh goes to the local mine, Furnace Creek, to meet with the mine's supervisor, Johnny, who attempts to bribe him to help Furnace Creek expand their operations. Johnny then meets with Maureen, who is trying to help him get approval from the local Aboriginal land council by bribing the land council's head, Tommy, to allow the use of the land.

Jay meets with a local Aboriginal elder, Jimmy, in his search for the missing Asian tourist. Jimmy leads him to Furnace Creek.

Jay sneaks past Furnace Creek's security checkpoint and observes several young Asian women disembarking from a plane and climbing into a van. The women are being forced into prostitution to pay off their debts. As Jay returns to his car, he is detained  overnight by Furnace Creek security, and the next morning, Johnny attempts to intimidate him.

Upon returning home, Jay is visited by Josh, who tells him Maureen has summoned Jay to meet her for tea. Jay complies, and Maureen subtly warns him to stop his investigation.

Johnny and Maureen hold a press conference where they announce the mine's expansion and make an ostentatious show of having council approval. However, Jimmy walks out, denying them his signature of approval.

Jay receives an anonymous call and  collects one of the girls' passports from the caller, then notices Josh's car. He follows Josh to the local creek, where Jimmy's body is hanging from a tree. Jay suspects foul play, but Josh states that Tommy witnessed the suicide.

Josh goes to the local bar/brothel, where the Asian girls are being kept. He befriends a prostitute called Mei and tells her to contact him if she needs help.

Tommy visits Josh, and confesses to killing Jimmy; he tells Josh about the corrupt activities of Maureen, Johnny, and the thugs who work as hitmen for Furnace Creek. Jay consults the man who found the passport and explores the area where it was found. There he finds a skeleton he assumes are the remains of the woman he was assigned to find.

Josh receives a missed call  message from Mei. When he arrives at the brothel all the girls have gone. Interrogating the bartender, Josh is told they are in a trailer in the desert.

Josh first visits Maureen, who is anxiously shredding paperwork, and demands that she put him in touch with the head of the criminal operations. She reluctantly agrees to make the call.

Josh arrives at the trailer, seeking the women, but finds it empty. The thugs arrive, ambush Josh, and force him to dig his own grave. Jay, who has surreptitiously followed Josh, shoots at the thugs from a sniper's perch, incapacitating some and forcing them all to flee. Jay then enlists Josh to track down the thugs and rescue the women.

Jay and Josh drive at the Furnace Creek site and, after an intense shootout with the thugs, discover the women's whereabouts. Jay sees Johnny's plane fleeing the mines and chases it, while Josh finds and rescues the women.

Jay arrives at the airfield but is intercepted by a black armed guard, whose gunshots cause Jay's vehicle to crash while Johnny escapes. Jay and the guard stand off but decide to spare one another.

Later, at Jay's remote shelter, Josh tells Jay the federal authorities have taken over the case, retrieved the women, and begun an investigation into the corruption. Additionally, Maureen has skipped town.

Josh says he has requested a transfer to somewhere near the ocean  where he can "shake off the dust" (corruption) of the outback. Jay bids him goodbye and drives away from Goldstone, into the desert, and retraces his visit with Jimmy to their ancestral site.

Cast
Aaron Pedersen as Jay Swan
Alex Russell as Josh Waters
Jacki Weaver as Maureen the Mayor
Cheng Pei-pei as Mrs Lao
David Gulpilil as Jimmy
Michelle Lim Davidson as Mei
David Wenham as Johnny
Michael Dorman as Patch
Kate Beahan as Pinky
Max Cullen as Old Timer
Tom E. Lewis as Tommy
Cameron Ambridge as Security Guard

Release
The film had its premiere at the Sydney Film Festival on 8 June 2016. It was released in Australia on 7 July 2016 and re-released on 2 March 2018. Its release for Blu-ray and DVD sales took place on 11 September 2018.

Reception

Box office
Goldstone grossed $87,639 in the United States and Canada and $562,713 in other territories for a worldwide total of $650,352, plus $11,987 with home video sales, against a production budget of $2 million.

Critical response
On review aggregator Rotten Tomatoes, the film has an approval rating of 76% based on 37 reviews, with an average rating of 7.07/10. The website's critical consensus reads, "Goldstone weaves socially conscious themes through its procedural thriller plot outline, with visually thrilling, solidly crafted results." Metacritic, which uses a weighted average, assigned a score of 78 out of 100, based on 10 critics, indicating "generally favorable reviews".

Accolades

References

External links
 
 
 

2016 films
Neo-Western films
Films set in Queensland
Films shot in Queensland
Australian crime thriller films
2016 crime thriller films
Australian sequel films
Films directed by Ivan Sen
2010s English-language films
Screen Australia films
Transmission Films films
Films about Aboriginal Australians